Let It Come Down is an American avant-garde art rock band composed of Kramer (founder of Shimmy-Disc) and Xan Tyler on the newly relaunched Shimmy-Disc label, in partnership with Joyful Noise Recordings.

History 
On April 29 2020, Joyful Noise Recordings named Kramer their 2020 Artist-In-Residence, simultaneously announcing a new partnership with Kramer for the rebirth of his Shimmy-Disc label. The first releases by the newly revived label were to be 3 singles recorded with Xan Tyler under project-name Let It Come Down. The release of this triptych was shortly followed by the duo's debut LP, entitled Songs We Sang In Our Dreams.

References 

Atlantic Records artists
Musical groups established in 1986
Musical groups from New York City
1986 establishments in New York City
Performance art in New York City
Shimmy Disc artists